The Metro Rail Transit Line 7, also known as MRT Line 7 or MRT-7, is a rapid transit line under construction in the Philippines. The line runs in a northeast–southwest direction, beginning at San Jose del Monte, Bulacan up to the North Triangle Common Station in North Avenue, Quezon City.

First planned in 2001 and approved in 2004, the 25-year concession agreement was signed in 2008 between the Philippine government and the project's original proponent, Universal LRT Corporation. However, construction has been repeatedly delayed due to right-of-way issues. The project was re-approved in 2013, while funding for the project was obtained in 2016. Construction on the line began the following year and is slated to open by December 2022. The project will cost an estimated  ₱62.7 billion (US$1.54 billion), with additional plans are laid for capacity expansion in order to accommodate the possible increase in passenger ridership in the future.

It is integrated with the public transit system in Metro Manila, and passengers also take various forms of road-based public transport, such as buses, to and from a station to reach their intended destination.

Route
The line will start at San Jose del Monte located in Bulacan and will end at the North Triangle Common Station in Quezon City. The rail line serves the cities that Quirino Highway, Regalado Highway, Commonwealth Avenue, and North Avenue passes through: San Jose del Monte in Bulacan, Caloocan and Quezon City in Metro Manila.

Stations
Upon completion, the line will have 14 stations along its route. Only one station, North Avenue, will serve as an interchange with the other metro lines.

History

Early planning and delays
A part of the right-of-way of the present MRT-7 project can be traced to the original MRT Line 4 proposal as part of the Metro Manila Urban Transportation Integration Study published by the Japan International Cooperation Agency in 1999. It called for the construction of a  elevated railway between Recto Avenue in Manila to Novaliches in Quezon City. A branch line, which would either be an automated guideway transit or busway, would have shuttle commuters to and from San Mateo, Rizal. This proposal would be later split into MRT-7 and the MRT Line 8 proposal. The section of this route between the Quezon Memorial Circle and Novaliches became Line 7 while the rest of the proposed line became Line 8.

On August 27, 2001, an early proposal of the MRT-7 project was submitted to the Department of Transportation and Communications (now the Department of Transportation). The Investment Coordination Committee (ICC) of the National Economic and Development Authority (NEDA) first approved a version of the MRT Line 7 project in March 2004; this initial approval was provisional and contingent on the project's impact on the government's deficit reduction program. It had been submitted as an unsolicited proposal under the build–operate–transfer scheme by the Universal LRT Corporation, a consortium consisting of Alstom, EEI Corporation, Tyco Electronics, and others. NEDA subsequently authorized the $1.2 billion project's construction the following August, citing the proponents' willingness to comply with the ICC's requirements, with construction slated to begin in 2005 and a targeted opening date in 2007. In October 2004, Universal LRT Corporation signed an agreement with the Manila Banking Corporation to purchase  of property in Bulacan for ₱1 billion, stating it would develop this property to complement the rail line.

Universal LRT Corporation, later renamed to now SMC-Mass Rail Transit 7 Incorporated, a subsidiary of San Miguel Corporation (SMC) was selected by the Department of Transportation and Communications to build the line in 2008. The concession agreement of the project was signed on June 18, 2008. Construction of the line should have commenced in January 2010, but was postponed several times.

In May 2012, the joint venture of Marubeni Corporation and DMCI was awarded a construction contract. However, after years of delays, SMC planned to conduct a second round of bidding in 2015, due to revised construction cost assumptions.

The current project was approved on November 21, 2013 by the NEDA board, chaired by President Benigno Aquino III, and the project was developed through a public-private partnership (PPP). It has an indicative cost of ₱62.7 billion.

The Department of Finance issued the terms of financial guarantee for the line in 2014, and financial closure for the project was achieved in February 2016. On January 22, 2016, Hyundai Rotem won the US$440.2 million contract with SMC-Mass Rail Transit 7 Incorporated to supply 108 train cars, signalling, communication and power supply systems.

Construction

Soil testing and surveying, including pre-construction related activities, were conducted in February 2016. SMC tapped the consortium of Hyundai Rotem and EEI Corporation as the engineering, procurement and construction contractor in the same year. A groundbreaking event was held on April 20, 2016, 15 years after initial development began, and was attended by President Benigno Aquino III. The line was expected to be finished by 2019, but was repeatedly pushed back because of right-of-way issues regarding the acquisition of a  land for the San Jose del Monte station, depot, and the intermodal transport terminal (ITT).

More than a year after the groundbreaking ceremony was held, construction on the  line officially started on August 15, 2017, and has resulted in lane closures and heavy traffic along Commonwealth Avenue and Quirino Highway, both in Quezon City. The project also includes construction of a  highway from the NLEX Bocaue Interchange, up to the proposed intermodal transport terminal (ITT) located near San Jose del Monte station.

Groundbreaking for Batasan station was held on October 7, 2017, while the excavation for the underground guideway at Quezon Memorial Circle is ongoing as of November 2017. Construction of the station and rail track along North Avenue began on January 22, 2018.

Nearly two years since the start of the construction of Line 7, works at the depot commenced on November 26, 2019 according to a statement by the DOTr. After two years of court hearings and appeals to obtain a site, the original location of the depot in San Jose del Monte, Bulacan was moved to Quirino Highway in Barangay Greater Lagro, Quezon City. The relocation was found optimal for right-of-way, operational reliability, and maintenance. The depot site was approved by Tugade on June 29, 2019, and the DOTr offered to buy the property from lot owners Century Properties Group, Inc. at the current market value, which was appraised by a Bangko Sentral ng Pilipinas-accredited independent property appraiser. Construction works at the depot started on May 31, 2022 after the land area was cleared.

Originally, the site in Bulacan was subject to a legal case after the property owner questioned the expropriation at the Malolos Regional Trial Court Branch 11. If it was pushed through, the cost of the project would have multiplied ninefold from ₱67.105 million to ₱598.905 million. Transport Assistant Secretary Goddes Hope Oliveros-Libiran stated that it would take forever to resolve the case and it will no longer be pursued. The case in Bulacan has prompted San Miguel to conduct a scheduled partial operation of the line from North Avenue to a station in Fairview in 2021.

In 2021, the project was realigned. Due to right-of-way issues, the original site of the Tala and San Jose del Monte station was relocated, and the guideway leading to the station itself was realigned, now passing through the Quirino Highway alignment instead of passing through Pangarap Village, which has been disputed for years.

, the project is 66.07% complete. The line was planned to undergo "demonstration runs" by 2023 and full operations by 2024-2025; but was later deemed no longer feasible, targeting full operations by the second quarter of 2025 instead, with DoTr Project Management Service (PMS) Director Eduardo D. Mangalili citing the completion of the depot as the main factor.

Station design and layout
The stations will have a standard layout, with a concourse level and a platform level. The concourse is usually above or below the platform, with stairs, escalators and elevators leading down to the platform level. Station concourses will contain ticket booths, which is separated from the platform level by fare gates. Most stations will be designed to be barrier-free inside and outside the station, and trains will have spaces for passengers using wheelchairs.

Stations will either have island platforms and side platforms.

Rolling stock

The line will be operated with 108 rail cars in a three-car configuration. Hyundai Rotem was awarded a $440.2 million contract to supply 108 metro cars, which will be configured into 36 train sets (3 cars per train set, with plans of expanding up to 6 cars per train set). The contractual scope also includes signalling, communications, and power supplies for the metro line. All ordered trainsets have undergone the necessary testing and trials. After being stored in South Korea since 2018 due to a lack of a depot, the 108 railcars are already in the process of being shipped to the Philippines. The first batch of two three-car trainsets arrived in the country on September 6, 2021. The trains were then brought from the Port of Manila to Commonwealth Avenue and were laid on the tracks near the  station from September 11 and 12. On the other hand, the trains are seen to begin test runs by April 2022. As of December 2021, six trainsets were delivered and laid on the tracks near Tandang Sora station, with the latest deliveries of two trains that were laid in November 2021. The trains were unveiled on December 16, 2021.

Depot 
The line will maintain an at-grade depot in Barangay Greater Lagro, Quezon City, close to the proximity of La Mesa Watershed. The depot occupies  of space and will be the center of the operations and maintenance of the line. It will be capable of handling 150 trains for future expansion of the line.

Expansion 
SMC plans for MRT-7 to evolve into a  network. Its main feature is a circumferential mainline comprising the present line, the Airport Access segment to the New Manila International Airport, the West Rail Link, and the Phase 2A between the Manila North Harbor and the North Avenue Common Station. Additional branches will also be built in northeastern Metro Manila and Rizal.

Phase 2A
The first proposed extension by phase number is Phase 2A, an unnamed westward extension of the line to Tutuban station via West Avenue, Quezon Avenue and Earnshaw Street before running parallel to the LRT Line 2 after Legarda station. This is similar to an earlier proposal under review, MRT Line 8, under the Philippine National Railways, that has proposed technical specifications identical to the MRT-7. Depending on the deliberations and pending approvals, the two lines may coexist or may be merged.

Phase 2A stations

Phase 2B (West Rail Link)
Phase 2B is dubbed the West Rail Link project. It will be an airport rail link to the New Manila International Airport and traversing the northwest coast of Metro Manila, in similar fashion to the Clark–Buendia Airport Limited Express of the North–South Commuter Railway. It will host express train services and aims to connect the NMIA and Metro Manila within 20 minutes. Thus, it will only have three stations: C2 in Manila, C4 in Navotas, and NMIA. The length of the segment is yet to be determined.

Phase 3 (Airport Access)
With the depot underway, San Miguel Corp. has plans to extend the line further to Bocaue, Bulacan, replacing the planned six-lane highway, which aims to be connected to the North Luzon Expressway. The extension will improve access to Ciudad de Victoria complex, where the Philippine Arena will be within its vicinity. Plans were also laid out connect the airport to the cities of Navotas, Malabon, and Manila, consisting of 19 additional stations, and will travel through the alignment of the LRT 2 Western Extension and the planned MRT 8, before traversing to West Avenue, and finally connecting the planned extension line to the North Triangle Common Station.

This segment shall be operated together with the Philippine National Railways.

Phase 4A (Southeast Alignment)
Phase 4A involves the construction of an extension from D. Tuazon station of Phase 2A to Taytay, Rizal. Excluding D. Tuazon, it will have 10 stations running on a northwest-southeast alignment. This project is also similar to the MRT Line 4, except it will run on the same Line 7 network, providing wider access of stations. It will also traverse areas north of Gilmore station towards Quezon Avenue. Line 4 was originally intended to be a monorail system, until it was upgraded to a heavy rail system.

Phase 4A stations

Phase 4B
Phase 4B involves the construction of a spur line between Ortigas Center and V. Mapa station of LRT Line 2. Excluding Meralco Avenue station and V. Mapa, it will have 6 stations traversing a U-shaped right of way.

Phase 5 (Katipunan spur)
Plans were also laid out for a  additional spur line, known as the MRT 7 Katipunan Spur Line, that aims to connect the line from Tandang Sora station to the LRT Line 2 at Katipunan and Marikina stations; the U.P. Town Center, the Ateneo de Manila University, the Riverbanks Center, and the MRT 4 Cainta Station. The project also consists of 8 additional stations, and will connect areas within Quezon City, Marikina, the eastern parts of Pasig, and Cainta, Rizal. The proposed spur line will traverse through the University of the Philippines Diliman complex, Katipunan Avenue, Aurora Boulevard, Andres Bonifacio Avenue, Sumulong Highway, Mayor Gil Fernando Avenue, and Felix Avenue.

Phase 5 stations

Notes

References

External links

R
Proposed public transportation in the Philippines
Rail transportation in Metro Manila
Transportation in Bulacan